Richert is a surname. Notable people with the surname include:

Carole Richert (born 1967), French actress
Hans-Egon Richert (1924-1993), German mathematician
Hedda Richert (1860–1929), Swedish writer and photographer
Johan Gabriel Richert (1784-1864), Swedish jurist and politician
Johann-Georg Richert (1890–1946), German officer executed for war crimes
Larry Richert, American journalist
Nate Richert (born 1978), American actor and musician
Pete Richert (born 1939), American baseball player
Philippe Richert (born 1953), French politician, member of the Senate of France
Teddy Richert (born 1974), French football player
William Richert (born 1942), American film director, producer, screenwriter and actor

See also
Jurkat-Richert theorem

Surnames from given names